Cabin Branch Pyrite Mine Historic District is a national historic district located at Prince William Forest Park, Triangle, Prince William County, Virginia. It encompasses 4 contributing sites and 42 contributing structures associated with the Cabin Branch pyrite mine.  The pyrite mine opened in 1889, and remained in operation until 1919 or 1920.  The property includes a number of capped mine shafts, and the remains of a commissary building and an old mill; and mine structures, including crusher house, mill, mechanical and support buildings, numerous rail lines.

It was added to the National Register of Historic Places in 2002.

References

Industrial buildings and structures on the National Register of Historic Places in Virginia
Historic districts in Prince William County, Virginia
National Register of Historic Places in Prince William County, Virginia
Historic districts on the National Register of Historic Places in Virginia
Prince William Forest Park